Elke Schmitter (born 25 January 1961, Krefeld, West Germany) is a German journalist, novelist and poet.

After studying philosophy in Munich, Schmitter worked as a journalist until 1994, when she became a full-time writer.

Her first novel to be translated into English was Mrs Sartoris, published in German in 2000 and English in 2003, .

References

1961 births
Living people
People from Krefeld
21st-century German novelists
German women novelists
21st-century German women writers
Der Spiegel people